Niall McGarry is an Irish entrepreneur who was the owner and founder of JOE.ie and Her.ie, male and female-focused websites in Ireland. Both websites fell under the banner of Maximum Media, the umbrella company founded by McGarry, who owned and ran both sites.

McGarry attended St. Gerald's College in Castlebar, Mayo. He then studied at Limerick Institute of Technology with rugby union player Jerry Flannery.
After graduating in 2002 with a degree in Marketing Management, McGarry worked for just over a year in advertising sales for a Galway Independent in Galway City.

Impact Media 
In 2003 in joined forces with Tom Lynskey and founded Impact Media. The company grew and represented clients including Supermacs, Eircom and Radisson Hotels.
Having grown the company to a 20-strong workforce, McGarry and Lynskey sold the business to Cork company H+A Marketing+PR in 2011.

JOE.IE 
McGarry originally created JOE.ie in 2010, providing an online outlet for Irish males with an interest in areas like sport, tech, entertainment, motors and fashion. McGarry created Her.ie, a site that caters for Irish women in July 2012 and has achieved almost instant success, already attracting an audience of over 2.2 million unique visitors each month.

In November 2019 McGarry announced that he was going to step away from executive involvement in the Irish business and he will focus instead on its business in the UK, where he launched with its Joe digital platform in 2015. He said he will work in conjunction with the existing management team in the UK.

In May 2020 the joe.ie parent company went into examinership.  In July 2020 it was bought out of administration by investment fund Greencastle Capital.

References

External links 
 
 
http://www.todayfm.com/Shows/Weekdays/Matt-Cooper/Matt-Cooper-Blog/10-04-23/Jerry_Flannery_and_his_new_Lads_Mag.aspx
http://www.broadsheet.ie/2012/04/11/will-it-be-like-that-girl-lego/
https://www.siliconrepublic.com/play/joe-ie-discovers-his-feminine-side-creates-10-new-jobs-too
https://eoy.ie/entrepreneurs/niall-mcgarry-maximum-mediajoe-media/
https://financehacks.ie/niall-mcgarry/
https://www.irishtimes.com/business/media-and-marketing/joe-ie-owner-maximum-media-on-target-for-record-revenues-1.3334020

1978 births
Living people
Irish businesspeople
Irish mass media company founders
Businesspeople in advertising
People from Castlebar
People educated at St Gerald's College, Castlebar